The 2022–2023 Lebanese presidential election is an ongoing indirect election to elect the president of Lebanon following the expiration of term-limited incumbent Michel Aoun's mandate on 31 October 2022. The outgoing president has served since 31 October 2016, following the end of the 2-year presidential crisis.

By convention, the presidency is always held by a Maronite Christian. Under article 49 of the Lebanese Constitution, a qualified majority of two-thirds of the members of the Lebanese Parliament is required to elect the president in the first round. If no candidate reaches that threshold, further rounds of election are held where an absolute majority of the members legally constituting the parliament is sufficient to elect the president. The incumbent president is not eligible for reelection until six years has passed since the expiration of his mandate, as per article 49 of the Lebanese Constitution.

Background

2019–21 protests 

Large-scale anti-government demonstrations ignited in the country from 17 October. Initially triggered in response to a rise in gas and tobacco prices as well as a new tax on messaging applications, the demonstrations quickly turned into a revolution against the stagnation of the economy, unemployment, Lebanon's sectarian and hereditary political system, corruption and the government's inability to provide essential services such as water, electricity and sanitation, Saad Hariri ended up resigning on 29 October 2019.

Hassan Diab was appointed Prime Minister by President Michel Aoun on 19 December 2019. His government obtained the confidence of parliament by 69 votes in its favour.

However, the country's economic situation continued to deteriorate. The government was indebted to the tune of over 95 billion dollars by the end of 2020, the Lebanese pound records a loss of 70% of its value in six months and unemployment affects 35% of the active population. Riots break out in Beirut and Tripoli and Jounieh.

Beirut explosion 

On 4 August 2020, the explosion of several thousand tons of ammonium nitrate stored in a hangar in the Port of Beirut caused considerable human and material damage across the city and the port. The final toll was 218 dead and over 7,000 injured and damage estimated at nearly four billion euros by the World Bank and estimated to have left 300,000 homeless. The industrial-port zone of the Port of Beirut's badly affected, further aggravating the economic situation. Vital for Lebanon, the port is the most important trading centres in Lebanon which ensures the transit of 60% of the country's imports.

Electoral system 

The Constitution of Lebanon does not provide for a specific candidacy procedure. Therefore, no individuals can be deemed to be official candidates, but legally only express an interest in the position.

Under article 49 of the Lebanese Constitution, a qualified majority of two-thirds of the members of the Lebanese Parliament is required to elect the president in the first round. The quorum also amounts to two-thirds of the Parliament. In the second round, a President can be elected by a simple majority of 65 deputies. There is however ambiguity on the constitutionality of the two-thirds quorum, since constitutional texts do not explicitly mention it. Some have interpreted this omission as intentional, such as legal scholar  Issam Khalifeh, while Speaker Nabih Berri has relied on the opposite interpretation to enable his allies to resort to quorum-busting. An example of this would be the 2014–2016 Lebanese presidential election, where quorum would not be met for forty-three electoral sessions.

The Constitution also states that, in the last ten days of the incumbent's tenure, the Parliament is vested in the powers of an electoral college.

National Pact 

Access to the Lebanese presidency is subject to an informal agreement known as the National Pact. Agreed in 1943, the latter limits this office only to members of the Maronite Christian faith.

The National Pact is based on an unwritten agreement concluded in 1943 between the Maronite Christian president Bechara El Khoury and his Sunni prime minister Riad Al Solh when Lebanon gained independence from France. The pact stipulates that the President of the Republic must be a Maronite Christian, the Prime minister a Sunni Muslim and the Speaker of parliament a Shiite Muslim.

Candidates

Declared interest 
 Bechara Abi Younes, candidate for the 2009 Lebanese general election, engineer and president of the Environmental Rescue party
 Ziad Hayek, former head of the High Council for Privatization and public-private partnership (2006–2019), Lebanese nominee for president of the World Bank in 2019
 Tracy Chamoun, daughter of Dany Chamoun and former ambassador of Lebanon to Jordan (2017–2020)
 May Rihani, international development and gender scholar, Director of the Gibran Chair for Values and Peace at the University of Maryland, former UN co-chair of the United Nations Girls' Education Initiative (2008–2010)
 Jean-Marie Kassab, author
 Elias Tawileh, engineer
 Milad Abou Malhab, activist
 Sayed Boutros Franjieh, businessman
 Elie Yachoui, Dean of the Business Administration and Economics faculty at the Notre Dame University–Louaize
 Clarence Kattini, lawyer and activist

Unconfirmed

Kataeb Party 

 Samy Gemayel, MP (2009–present) and incumbent party leader (2015–present)
 Nadim Gemayel, MP (2009–present)

Lebanese Forces 

 Samir Geagea, incumbent party leader (2005–present)
 Sethrida Geagea, MP (2005–present) and former chairwoman of the party

Free Patriotic Movement 

 Gebran Bassil, MP (2018–present), incumbent party leader (2015–present) and former Minister of Telecommunications (2009–2009), Energy and Water (2009–2014) and Foreign Affairs (2014–2020)
 Nada Boustani Khoury, MP (2022–present) and former Minister of Energy and Water (2019–2020)
 Ibrahim Kanaan, MP (2005–present) and Chairman of the Parliamentary Budget and Financial Affairs Commission (2009–present)

Other 
 Suleiman Frangieh, incumbent leader of the Marada Movement (1992–present), former MP (1991–2005, 2009–2018) and Minister in different portfolios (1990–2005)
 Joseph Aoun, 14th Commander of the Lebanese Armed Forces (2017–present)
 Michel Moawad, MP (2018–present) and incumbent leader of the Independence Movement (2005–present)
 Naji Abi Assi, former Ambassador and presidential advisor
 Ziyad Baroud, lawyer, professor and former Minister of Interior (2008–2011) and candidate for the 2018 Lebanese general election
 Salah Honein, former MP (2000–2005) and member of the Qornet Shehwan Gathering
 Chibli Mallat, international lawyer, professor and candidate for the aborted 2005–2006 presidential election
 Neemat Frem, CEO of INDEVCO Group and MP (2018–present)
 Jihad Azour, former Minister of Finance (2005–2008)
 Samir Assaf, HSBC executive
 Naji Boustany, lawyer, former Minister of Culture (2004–2005) and candidate for the 2018 Lebanese general election

Declined 

 Salim Eddé, CEO of Murex
 Nassif Hitti, professor and former Minister of Foreign Affairs (2020)
 Issam Khalifeh, historian, academic at the Lebanese University and trade unionist, first president of the National Union of Lebanese University Students

Election

First session 

The first electoral session was held on 29 September 2022. The first and only round did not result in any candidate's election, due to the need to secure an absolute majority of 86 votes. Notably, 10 MPs voted for "Lebanon" while one vote went to Mahsa Amini. Before the second round, a number of deputies unexpectedly left the Chamber, leading the assembly to lose the quorum by one MP and postponing the vote.

Second session 
A second session was held on 13 October but failed to secure a quorum with only 71 out of 128 deputies being there due to FPM boycotting the session in memorial of 13 October 1990, below the quorum of 2/3 (86 deputies). A third one is scheduled for 20 October

Third session 
A third session was held on 20 October. Michel Moawad received 42 votes, 55 MPs voted with a blank slip, one MP voted for Milad Abou Malhab. 17 MPs submitted ballots reading "New Lebanon", and one each for "Ruler, savior and reformer", "For Lebanon", "Righteous dictator" and "Nobody". The second round was once again cancelled as FPM deputies left the Chamber, causing the loss of the quorum. A fourth session is scheduled for 24 October.

Fourth session 

The fourth session to elect a president was held on October 24 with the presence of 114 deputies. In the first (and only) round, Moawad received 39 votes, while 50 blank ballots were registered, and 10 votes for Dr. Issam Khalifeh, a reputable academic nominated by a number of pro-Change MPs. A number of MPs voted "New Lebanon" as in the previous session, while Jamil Al Sayyed wrote "My Condolences" on his ballot paper. As per the previous sessions, quorum was lost before a second round could be held.

Vacuum 
Michel Aoun signed the government's resignation decree, a day before his six-year term officially ended, and Prime Minister Najib Mikati's government remains in office in a caretaker capacity, which is unconstitutional since it goes against Aoun's request for the cabinet's step-down after numerous attempts failed to form a new cabinet. Aoun's term officially ended in 31 October 2022 after 6 years in office, with no successor designated, similarly to his predecessors.

Fifth session 

The fifth session to elect a president was held on November 10 with the presence of 108 deputies. In the first (and only) round, Moawad received 44 votes, while 47 blank ballots were registered, 6 votes for Dr. Issam Khalifeh, a reputable academic nominated by a number of pro-Change MPs, 1 vote for former Minister Ziyad Baroud from Deputy Speaker Elias Bou Saab and 1 vote for Ziad Hayek from Elias Jaradeh. 7 MPs voted "New Lebanon" as in the previous session, while Zgharta MP Michel Douaihy wrote "Plan B" on his ballot paper and one vote went "For Lebanon". As per the previous sessions, quorum was lost before a second round could be held.

Sixth session 

The sixth session to elect a president was held on November 17 with the presence of 112 deputies. In the first (and only) round, Moawad received 43 votes, while 46 blank ballots were registered, 7 votes for Dr. Issam Khalifeh, 1 vote for former Minister Ziyad Baroud, 1 vote for MP Michel Daher and 1 vote for Suleiman Frangieh Jr. 9 MPs voted "New Lebanon" while 2 ballots were cancelled. As per the previous sessions, quorum was lost before a second round could be held, a seventh session is scheduled for Thursday 24 November.

Seventh session 
The seventh session to elect a president was held on 24 November. No candidate obtained a majority in the first round. As per the previous sessions, quorum was lost before a second round could be held. The next session will be held in early December 2022.

Eighth session 
The eighth session to elect a president was held on 1 December 2022. No candidate obtained a majority in the first round. As per the previous sessions, quorum was lost before a second round could be held. Another session will be held on 8 December.

Ninth session 
The ninth session to elect a president was held on 8 December 2022. No candidate obtained a majority in the first round. As per the previous sessions, quorum was lost before a second round could be held. Another session will be held on 15 December.

Tenth session 
The tenth session to elect a president was held on 15 December 2022. No candidate obtained a majority in the first round. As per the previous sessions, quorum was lost before a second round could be held. Another session will be held in January 2023. The session sheduled for 12 January 2023 was postponed by the speaker due to the death of Hussein El-Husseini.

Eleventh session 
The eleventh session to elect a president was held on 19 January 2023. No candidate obtained a majority in the first round. As per the previous sessions, quorum was lost before a second round could be held. After the election two MP's from the Change Movement locked themselves in parliament in protest.

See also 

 2022 Lebanese general election
 2022 Speaker of the Lebanese Parliament election
 President of Lebanon
 Lebanese liquidity crisis

References 

Lebanon
Presidential election
Elections in Lebanon
Presidential election
Presidential elections in Lebanon